This article is about the particular significance of the year 1837 to Wales and its people.

Incumbents
Lord Lieutenant of Anglesey – Henry Paget, 1st Marquess of Anglesey 
Lord Lieutenant of Brecknockshire – Penry Williams
Lord Lieutenant of Caernarvonshire – Peter Drummond-Burrell, 22nd Baron Willoughby de Eresby 
Lord Lieutenant of Cardiganshire – William Edward Powell
Lord Lieutenant of Carmarthenshire – George Rice, 3rd Baron Dynevor 
Lord Lieutenant of Denbighshire – Sir Watkin Williams-Wynn, 5th Baronet    
Lord Lieutenant of Flintshire – Robert Grosvenor, 1st Marquess of Westminster 
Lord Lieutenant of Glamorgan – John Crichton-Stuart, 2nd Marquess of Bute 
Lord Lieutenant of Merionethshire – Sir Watkin Williams-Wynn, 5th Baronet
Lord Lieutenant of Monmouthshire – Capel Hanbury Leigh
Lord Lieutenant of Montgomeryshire – Edward Herbert, 2nd Earl of Powis
Lord Lieutenant of Pembrokeshire – Sir John Owen, 1st Baronet
Lord Lieutenant of Radnorshire – George Rodney, 3rd Baron Rodney

Bishop of Bangor – Christopher Bethell 
Bishop of Llandaff – Edward Copleston 
Bishop of St Asaph – William Carey 
Bishop of St Davids – John Jenkinson

Events
1 April – John Josiah Guest is elected the first chairman of the Merthyr "board of guardians", formed with the view of obtaining an act of Parliament for the incorporation of Merthyr. 
10 May – 21 men are killed in a mining accident at Plas-yr-Argoed, Mold, Flintshire.
July /August – In the United Kingdom general election:
Sir John Edwards, 1st Baronet, defeats Panton Corbett to win Montgomery for the Liberals for a second time.
Edwin Wyndham-Quin, 3rd Earl of Dunraven and Mount-Earl joins Christopher Rice Mansel Talbot as MP for Glamorganshire.
Sir Stephen Glynne, 9th Baronet, future brother-in-law of Gladstone, becomes MP for Flintshire.
William Bulkeley Hughes defeats Charles Henry Paget to take Caernarvon Boroughs for the Tories.
date unknown
Chartist riots in Montgomeryshire.  
George Rowland Edwards becomes secretary to Lord Clive.
Major reconstruction of Penrhyn Castle in north Wales by Thomas Hopper (architect) is largely completed.

Arts and literature
Henry Mark Anthony exhibits A view on the Rhaidha [sic] Glamorganshire at the Royal Academy.
The Welsh Manuscripts Society is founded at Abergavenny.

New books
Charles James Apperley – The Chace, the Road, and the Turf
Eliza Constantia Campbell – Tales about Wales

Music
Robert Edwards – Caersalem (hymn tune), published in Peroriaeth Hyfryd

Births
14 March – Thomas Meyrick, politician (d. 1921)
26 May – Henry Hicks, geologist (d. 1899)
3 August – Lewis Pugh Pugh, politician (d. 1908)
5 August – William Lewis, 1st Baron Merthyr, industrialist (d. 1914)
6 September – Henry Thomas Edwards, preacher (d. 1884)
22 September – Thomas Charles Edwards, minister, writer and first principal of the University of Wales (d. 1900
26 December – Sir William Boyd Dawkins, geologist (d. 1929)
date unknown
John Griffiths, mathematician (d. 1916)
Octavius Vaughan Morgan, politician (d. 1896)
William Bowen Rowlands, politician (d. 1906)

Deaths
31 January – John Rolls of The Hendre, English-born landowner, 60
19 February – Thomas Burgess, former Bishop of St David's, 80
27 September – William Pryce Cumby, Superintendent of Pembroke Dockyard, 66
20 November – John Edward Madocks, MP, 51

References

 
Wales